Civilian oversight, sometimes referred to as civilian review or citizen oversight, is a form of civilian participation in reviewing government activities, most commonly accusations of police misconduct. Members of civilian oversight or civilian review boards are generally not employed by the government entity which they are reviewing. These groups are tasked with direct involvement in the citizen complaints process and develop solutions to improve government accountability. Responsibilities of civilian oversight groups can vary significantly depending on the jurisdiction and their ability to become influential. Oversight should not simply criticize but should improve government through citizen support for government responsiveness, accountability, transparency, and overall efficiency.

Proactive civilian oversight improves transparency and demands accountability at all levels of government. Reporting and monitoring (financial records, performance measures, and open records,... etc.) are now regarded as fundamental governance responsibilities. Citizen Advisory Boards are a way for civilians to be involved in government oversight. Other forms of government oversight include citizen committees, community panels, citizen juries, public participation, negotiated rulemaking, and mediation 

An effective civilian oversight committee is structured to take on the following responsibilities: create processes for risk governance, monitoring and reporting; create clear defined duties to improve effectiveness and avoid overlapping work; recruit/retain members that are knowledgeable and engaged about policy; develop critiques that result in improved service outcomes; assign oversight responsibilities to designated individuals or groups for specific government functions; and reviews rolls regularly.

Civilian oversight boards brainstorm ideas to improve transparency and create policy proposals. Most proposals regarding civilian oversight have been with respects to police activities, healthcare, non-profit and private sector.

Definition and scope

According to the National Association for Civilian Oversight of Law Enforcement (NACOLE):
"Sometimes referred to as citizen oversight, civilian review, external review and citizen review boards (Walker 2001; Alpert et al. 2016), this form of police accountability is often focused on allowing non-police actors to provide input into the police department’s operations, often with a focus on the citizen complaint process. In some jurisdictions, this is sometimes accomplished by allowing oversight practitioners (both paid and volunteer) to review, audit or monitor complaint investigations that were conducted by police internal affairs investigators. In other jurisdictions, it is done by allowing civilians to conduct independent investigations of allegations of misconduct lodged against sworn law enforcement officers. It can also be accomplished through the creation of mechanisms that are authorized to review and comment on police policies, practices, training and systemic conduct. Some oversight mechanisms involve a combination of systemic analysis and complaint handling or review."

Change in political attitude 
Civilian oversight is the result of a profound change in public attitudes toward government particularly related to trust. There is a lack of trust between communities and government/business because of historical misconduct. Misconduct included racial discrimination during the civil rights era, illegal activities during the Watergate scandal, and more recently the general public disagreement with government bailouts and financial fraud like Enron scandal. All these actions have caused an increased demand in accountability. Trust is a measured by gauging how effective ordinary civilians feel local policies and authorities are in their duties as official. A series of laws have been created indicating the growing public concern about the need for oversight of government agencies.

In the 21st Century, the trend towards providing legislative oversight over intelligence services and their activities has been a growing phenomenon. Scandals and new laws in the ever-changing political situation over the last twenty years have made it a necessity for Legislative oversight over problematic intelligence and security programs. Resulting in a clear push towards reigning in government agencies overstepping their boundaries and made civilian oversight a requirement over national security and law enforcement.

Related US rules, regulations and laws
Freedom of information
Sarbanes–Oxley Act
Patient Protection and Affordable Care Act
Inspector General Act of 1978
Privacy Act of 1974

Benefits and weaknesses 
Benefit
Increased focus on monitoring, reporting, strategic advising, value creation, accountability, and the creation of professional standards.

Civilian oversight serves as a benefit to the citizens as it promotes a willingness of organizations subjected to be more open to engagement. Shifting towards engaging with the people being served and more attention towards accountability opens new avenues of service delivery. Organizations that can be made to submit to oversight of the population being served allows for changes that would benefit the population.

Weakness or setbacks
Accountability, transparency, and reporting are important to citizen oversight. Acts like Patient Protection and Affordable Care Act have caused an increase in oversight responsibilities requiring increased reporting, extensive examination of performance, and increased accountability of internal citizen oversight. Oversight can be excessive and ultimately detrimental to desirable outcomes, and administrators spend a significant amount of time on monitoring and less on strategies. Difficulty forming citizen groups, failing to function effectively, agency role is not visible enough or influential, group is abolished altogether.

International 
Civilian participation and accountability initiatives have become a common practice in democratic nations. Reporting and monitoring results are now regarded as fundamental governance responsibilities  The growth of civilian oversight is not confined to the United States. Citizen oversight (particularly for the police) is universal and has expanded across the English-speaking world and is spreading in Latin America, Asia, and continental Europe 
International Asian countries do not look at service-oriented policing like western countries. Asian democracies focus on defense and maintenance of established rules, reviewing and monitoring government actions and policing human rights violations, police corruption, and corporate management. Research in the United Kingdom has noted the importance of oversight of state functions such as prisons to ensure the fair and humane detention of vulnerable persons such as prisoners.

Hong Kong's civilian oversight is considered to be far more transparent, independent, sufficient at holding government accountable. Possibly a result of being largely more democratic, than countries like China. Nearly all Asian democracies have some form of oversight, but only 3 have civilian oversight.

History in the United States
The first organized efforts to conduct civilian oversight of police began in the 1920s. The table below is predominantly related to police oversight between 1920 and 1980. By 1980 there were about 13 agencies, and by 2000 more than 100 such as the Independent Police Auditor (IPA) in San Jose, California and Seattle, Washington and the Office of Independent Review (OIR) in New York City, New York.

External links 
 National Association for Civilian Oversight of Law Enforcement (NACOLE)
 Links to U.S. civilian oversight agencies
 Canadian Association for Civilian Oversight of Law Enforcement (CACOLE)

References 

Active citizenship
Sources of law
Civilian regulating boards
Police oversight organizations